The Church of Saint Felix of Cantalice at Centocelle is a Roman Catholic titular church in Rome located in the Centocelle quarter, built as a parish church by decree of Cardinal Francesco Marchetti Selvaggiani, Vicar General of Rome.

The church was given papal endorsement on 30 April 1969, when Pope Paul VI made it a titular church for cardinals. He blessed its fresco on the Solemnity of Mary, Mother of God and World Day of Peace, 1970.

The church is referred to as a Centocelle (English: "at Centocelle") because it located at the site of a former Roman imperial cavalry barracks.

It has been the titular church of Philippine Cardinal Luis Antonio Tagle since 24 November 2012, and became pro hac vice suburbicarian when Cardinal Tagle was co-opted to Cardinal Bishop rank in 2020. It has been administered by the Order of Friars Minor Capuchin since 1928.

On 10 March 2013, Cardinal Tagle celebrated Holy Mass with members of the Italian-Filipino communities before attending the 2013 papal conclave.

History
On 14 November 1929, the Italian Marquis Achilles Muti-Bussi donated the land to the Roman Catholic Church as a gesture of goodwill for its impoverished peasants living nearby.

The Capuchin friars arrived on 16 December 1930 and on 20 September of the same year the cornerstone was laid for their new Capuchin monastery. On 30 May 1932, the church itself was canonically signed and erected but the actual construction of the church began in 1934.

The original church itself was established on 29 March 1935 through the apostolic decree by Vicar General of Rome, Cardinal Francesco Marchetti Selvaggiani in his letter "Sollicitudo Omnium Ecclesiarum" (English: "We encourage the whole church"), which canonically entrusted the shrine to the Order of Friars Minor Capuchin who tended to the poor slums of the area. The church was formally recognized on 17 October 1935 by the Holy See in the Acta Apostolicae Sedis.

Several religious sisters have also joined in the church's charity program throughout the years, such as the Benedictine Nuns (1925), the Daughters of Charity of Saint Vincent de Paul (1935) and the Franciscan nuns (1927).  The nuns assisted the Capuchin Friars in tending to the poor children, prostitutes and the unemployed.

On 1 October 1934, Cardinal Vicar Ugo Poletti drew the exact land measurements and ownership of the parish, which was enacted into civil law on 17 October 1935. The parish complex was designed by Italian architects Mario Paniconi and Ciulio Pediconi. On 2 October 1941, the church was consecrated by Monsignor Luigi Traglia, who was then the titular archbishop of Caesarea in Palestine, and the vice-regent of Rome. The land territory was taken from one of the sub-parishes of Saint Marcellino e Pietro ad Duas Lauros and Saint Mary of Good Counsel church. 
 
In July 1968, the Vicariate of Rome approved the fresco in the apse of the church featuring Saint Felix of Cantalice, its namesake patron saint made by Father Ugolino from Belluno (born Silvio Alessandri, born 15 December 1919). At the time, the fresco was heavily criticized for its modern architecture, its polychrome colours, the poor natural lighting, and the manner in which it was painted on the wall of 480 square meters.
 
On 1 January 1970, on the occasion of the World Day of Peace, Pope Paul VI blessed the apse of the church in a ceremony televised live by RAI.

On 1 May 2020, Pope Francis conceded to Cardinal Luis Antonio Tagle, Prefect for the Evangelization of Peoples the rank of cardinal-bishop making the church a suburbicarian church pro hac vice.

Architecture 
The main façade has a polychromed modern painting which depicts Saint Felix of Cantalice in prayer. The church is decorated with works of the Franciscan Capuchin artist Ugolino da Belluno, which include the Madonna and Child with Saint Felix in the apse and the Appearance of angels and Jesus in a vision of St Francis in the transept.

The fresco in the apse features the Madonna as Virgin of the Flowers, wearing a robe of lilies while handing down the Child Jesus to Saint Felix, hooded and prostrate. Below are images of the Jewish children of Terezin who were exterminated by the Nazi authorities, while a newspaper image of Mario Dominici is featured, the boy found dead in the area during World War II as a result of Nazi Anti-Semitism. It also features cherubic angels, and zodiac sign constellations which tell the story of creation. Other scenes of the frescoes involve morality tales, anti-greed and anti-pornographic sentiments, as well as several miraculous scenes from the life of Saint Felix of Cantalice.

List of Cardinals 
 Stephen Kim Sou-hwan of Korea — Cardinal-Priest by Pope Paul VI — (30 April 1969 – 16 February 2009) 
 Luis Antonio Tagle of the Philippines — Cardinal-Priest by Pope Benedict XVI — (24 November 2012 – 1 May 2020) — Cardinal-Bishop by Pope Francis — (1 May 2020 – Present)

References

 C. Rendina, Le Chiese di Roma, Newton & Compton Editori, Milano 2000
 C. Cerchiai, Quartiere XIX. Prenestino-Centocelle, in AA.VV, I quartieri di Roma, Newton & Compton Editori, Roma 2006

Felice Da Cantalice
Felice Da Cantalice
Rome Q. XIX Prenestino-Centocelle